Millennium Luxury Coaches is a luxury motor coach manufacturer based in Sanford, Florida, founded in 2000 by Nelson Figueroa.

Products and services 
Millennium builds Prevost XLII, X3, and H3-45 luxury coach conversions, available in multiple slide and bay configurations.

In 2013 Millennium started using a Savant Systems custom interface.

Millennium is a Prevost-authorized service centre equipped to provide professional collision, fiberglass and dent repair. They also provide awning installation, delamination, window replacement, and full detailing. Additional services that can be found at Millennium are free insurance estimates, secured coach parking and RV storage.

Achievements 

In January 2011 Millennium was a recipient of the inaugural 2011 Florida Companies to Watch Award, selected by the Edward Lowe Foundation.

In July 2012, Millennium gained approval to be added to Transport Canada's List of Vehicles Admissible from the United States, after confirming compliance with all applicable Canadian Motor Vehicle Safety Standards (CMVSS), and the Canadian Motor Vehicle Safety Act (MVSA).

In December 2012, Millennium Luxury Coaches announced they had successfully relocated the diesel exhaust fluid inlet to the driver's side of the coach. It had previously been located on the passenger's side, which presented a problem at filling stations because the pump was located on the driver's side. This stirred controversy as skeptics noted it brought warranty concerns about Prevost. Prevost engineers and management visited Millennium's facility to view the modifications, approve the modifications and eliminate the warranty concerns.

In May 2013, Millennium received the Association for Corporate Growth's (ACG) SMART Award for the field of Distribution and Transportation.

In August 2013, Millennium was awarded the Ultimate Newcomer title, as part of the 2013 Golden 100 Awards.

Events and TV appearances 
In January 2012, Millennium was selected to be featured in the TV show Ultimate Travel for their "Tricked Out Trailers" episode, appearing on the Travel Channel.

In April 2011, Millennium was featured on HouseSmarts TV with Lou Manfredini.

On October 4, 2012, it was announced that Millennium Luxury Coaches was to be featured for an upcoming series titled EPIC which was to air on Destination America. EPIC RVs premiered on February 11, 2013. On July 15, 2013, Millennium Luxury Coaches was to be featured on the season 2 premiere of EPIC, on Discovery's Destination America Network.

Millennium Luxury Coaches has also made radio appearances and industry-related appearances. These events include the Tampa RV Supershow, Concours d'Elegance, Fort Lauderdale International Boat Show, Cars for the Cure, Barrett Jackson Auto Auction, and RV shows.

In January 2013 Millennium Luxury Coaches announced a new video series entitled The Journey with episode 1, "The Journey Begins". Millennium planned for more episodes in the following months, showcasing the luxury coach building process.

Millennium has been featured on the June cover of Family Motor Coach Association Magazine.

External links
Homepage of Millennium Luxury Coaches; retrieved 6 September 2021

References

Luxury
Bus manufacturers of the United States
Recreational vehicle manufacturers
Volvo buses